The following is a list of players, both past and current, who appeared at least in one game for the Denver Nuggets NBA franchise.



Players
Note: Statistics are correct through the end of the  season.

A

|-
|align="left"| || align="center"|G || align="left"|LSU || align="center"|6 || align="center"|– || 439 || 12,481 || 903 || 1,756 || 7,029 || 28.4 || 2.1 || 4.0 || 16.0 || align=center|
|-
|align="left"| || align="center"|F || align="left"|San Jose State || align="center"|3 || align="center"|– || 64 || 1,210 || 189 || 70 || 380 || 18.9 || 3.0 || 1.1 || 5.9 || align=center|
|-
|align="left"| || align="center"|G || align="left"|Boston College || align="center"|4 || align="center"|– || 304 || 10,601 || 987 || 2,181 || 5,534 || 34.9 || 3.2 || 7.2 || 18.2 || align=center|
|-
|align="left"| || align="center"|G/F || align="left"|UCLA || align="center"|4 || align="center"|– || 266 || 8,381 || 880 || 556 || 3,305 || 31.5 || 3.3 || 2.1 || 12.4 || align=center|
|-
|align="left"| || align="center"|G || align="left"|Illinois State || align="center"|1 || align="center"| || 7 || 22 || 4 || 6 || 7 || 3.1 || 0.6 || 0.9 || 1.0 || align=center|
|-
|align="left"| || align="center"|F || align="left"|Duke || align="center"|1 || align="center"| || 64 || 1,110 || 214 || 74 || 503 || 17.3 || 3.3 || 1.2 || 7.9 || align=center|
|-
|align="left"| || align="center"|G || align="left"|Virginia || align="center"|3 || align="center"|– || 88 || 1,904 || 215 || 315 || 666 || 21.6 || 2.4 || 3.6 || 7.6 || align=center|
|-
|align="left"| || align="center"|G || align="left"|Penn || align="center"|1 || align="center"| || 25 || 251 || 33 || 43 || 64 || 10.0 || 1.3 || 1.7 || 2.6 || align=center|
|-
|align="left"| || align="center"|F/C || align="left"|Villanova || align="center"|1 || align="center"| || 51 || 456 || 82 || 16 || 105 || 8.9 || 1.6 || 0.3 || 2.1 || align=center|
|-
|align="left"| || align="center"|F/C || align="left"|Blinn || align="center"|7 || align="center"|–– || 378 || 6,571 || 1,940 || 164 || 1,938 || 17.4 || 5.1 || 0.4 || 5.1 || align=center|
|-
|align="left"| || align="center"|F/C || align="left"|Houston || align="center"|2 || align="center"|– || 123 || 3,452 || 1,178 || 90 || 1,159 || 28.1 || 9.6 || 0.7 || 9.4 || align=center|
|-
|align="left"| || align="center"|G/F || align="left"|Saint Joseph's || align="center"|1 || align="center"| || 3 || 22 || 4 || 4 || 6 || 7.3 || 1.3 || 1.3 || 2.0 || align=center|
|-
|align="left"| || align="center"|G || align="left"|USC || align="center"|1 || align="center"| || 5 || 33 || 2 || 3 || 21 || 6.6 || 0.4 || 0.6 || 4.2 || align=center|
|-
|align="left"| || align="center"|F/C || align="left"|UC Santa Barbara || align="center"|1 || align="center"| || 78 || 1,380 || 406 || 193 || 663 || 17.7 || 5.2 || 2.5 || 8.5 || align=center|
|-
|align="left" bgcolor="#FFCC00"|+ || align="center"|F || align="left"|Syracuse || align="center"|8 || align="center"|– || 564 || 20,521 || 3,566 || 1,729 || 13,970 || 36.4 || 6.3 || 3.1 || 24.8 || align=center|
|-
|align="left"| || align="center"|G || align="left"|FIU || align="center"|1 || align="center"| || 20 || 275 || 28 || 49 || 81 || 13.8 || 1.4 || 2.5 || 4.1 || align=center|
|-
|align="left"| || align="center"|F || align="left"|Kansas || align="center"|5 || align="center"|– || 256 || 4,445 || 801 || 265 || 1,626 || 17.4 || 3.1 || 1.0 || 6.4 || align=center|
|-
|align="left"| || align="center"|G/F || align="left"|Memphis || align="center"|1 || align="center"| || 1 || 9 || 0 || 0 || 6 || 9.0 || 0.0 || 0.0 || 6.0 || align=center|
|-
|align="left"| || align="center"|G || align="left"|South Florida || align="center"|2 || align="center"|– || 38 || 467 || 37 || 75 || 140 || 12.3 || 1.0 || 2.0 || 3.7 || align=center|
|-
|align="left"| || align="center"|G || align="left"|Texas || align="center"|1 || align="center"| || 28 || 659 || 52 || 132 || 325 || 23.5 || 1.9 || 4.7 || 11.6 || align=center|
|}

B

|-
|align="left"| || align="center"|F || align="left"|South Carolina || align="center"|3 || align="center"|– || 71 || 915 || 230 || 43 || 291 || 12.9 || 3.2 || 0.6 || 4.1 || align=center|
|-
|align="left"| || align="center"|G || align="left"|Tennessee State || align="center"|1 || align="center"| || 24 || 684 || 54 || 77 || 274 || 28.5 || 2.3 || 3.2 || 11.4 || align=center|
|-
|align="left"| || align="center"|G || align="left"|Georgia Tech || align="center"|1 || align="center"| || 57 || 1,101 || 123 || 147 || 351 || 19.3 || 2.2 || 2.6 || 6.2 || align=center|
|-
|align="left" bgcolor="#CCFFCC"|x || align="center"|G || align="left"|Memphis || align="center"|7 || align="center"|– || 408 || 12,265 || 2,062 || 1,311 || 5,652 || 30.1 || 5.1 || 3.2 || 13.9 || align=center|
|-
|align="left"| || align="center"|C || align="left"|China || align="center"|1 || align="center"| || 27 || 408 || 96 || 22 || 139 || 15.1 || 3.6 || 0.8 || 5.1 || align=center|
|-
|align="left"| || align="center"|F || align="left"|Ohio State || align="center"|1 || align="center"|  || 7 || 98  || 17 || 0 || 37 || 14.0 || 2.4 || .0 || 5.3 || align=center|
|-
|align="left"| || align="center"|F/C || align="left"|Texas Tech || align="center"|1 || align="center"| || 65 || 1,506 || 351 || 60 || 544 || 23.2 || 5.4 || 0.9 || 8.4 || align=center|
|-
|align="left"| || align="center"|F || align="left"|Illinois || align="center"|1 || align="center"| || 40 || 682 || 123 || 47 || 243 || 17.1 || 3.1 || 1.2 || 6.1 || align=center|
|-
|align="left" | || align="center"|G || align="left"|Florida State || align="center"|4 || align="center"|– || 206 || 3,373 || 365 || 187 || 1,521 || 16.4 || 1.8 || 0.9 || 7.4 || align=center|
|-
|align="left"| (#40) || align="center"|F/C || align="left"|Denver || align="center"|10 || align="center"|– || 747 || 19,197 || 5,261 || 978 || 8,603 || 25.7 || 7.0 || 1.3 || 11.5 || align=center|
|-
|align="left"| || align="center"|F || align="left"|Arizona State || align="center"|2 || align="center"|– || 113 || 2,996 || 680 || 144 || 1,475 || 26.5 || 6.0 || 1.3 || 13.1 || align=center|
|-
|align="left"| || align="center"|G || align="left"|Notre Dame || align="center"|1 || align="center"| || 5 || 59 || 3 || 7 || 12 || 11.8 || 0.6 || 1.4 || 2.4 || align=center|
|-
|align="left" bgcolor="#FFCC00"|+ || align="center"|G || align="left"|Colorado || align="center"|5 || align="center"|–– || 259 || 8,648 || 712 || 1,383 || 4,378 || 33.4 || 2.7 || 5.3 || 16.9 || align=center|
|-
|align="left"| || align="center"|G || align="left"|Maryland || align="center"|1 || align="center"| || 49 || 1,642 || 124 || 324 || 408 || 33.5 || 2.5 || 6.6 || 8.3 || align=center|
|-
|align="left"| || align="center"|C || align="left"|Pittsburgh || align="center"|1 || align="center"| || 54 || 885 || 183 || 35 || 281 || 16.4 || 3.4 || 0.6 || 5.2 || align=center|
|-
|align="left" bgcolor="#CCFFCC"|x || align="center"|F/C || align="left"|Oregon || align="center"|2 || align="center"| – || 39 || 247 || 43 || 13 || 109 || 6.3 || 1.1 || 0.3 || 2.8 || align=center|
|-
|-
|align="left"| || align="center"|G || align="left"|Missouri || align="center"|1 || align="center"| || 5 || 21 || 1 || 3 || 5 || 4.2 || 0.2 || 0.6 || 1.0 || align=center|
|-
|align="left"| || align="center"|F/C || align="left"|South Carolina || align="center"|2 || align="center"|– || 97 || 2,723 || 652 || 288 || 1,043 || 28.1 || 6.7 || 3.0 || 10.8 || align=center|
|-
|align="left"| || align="center"|F || align="left"|Iowa || align="center"|5 || align="center"|– || 298 || 4,359 || 770 || 174 || 955 || 14.6 || 2.6 || 0.6 || 3.2 || align=center|
|-
|align="left"| || align="center"|F/C || align="left"|Grambling State || align="center"|1 || align="center"| || 67 || 1,287 || 374 || 41 || 410 || 19.2 || 5.6 || 0.6 || 6.1 || align=center|
|-
|align="left"| || align="center"|G || align="left"|Eastern Michigan || align="center"|4 || align="center"|– || 255 || 6,430 || 430 || 1,029 || 3,082 || 25.2 || 1.7 || 4.0 || 12.1 || align=center|
|-
|align="left"| || align="center"|F || align="left"|Northern Illinois || align="center"|1 || align="center"| || 7 || 107 || 30 || 11 || 32 || 15.3 || 4.3 || 1.6 || 4.6 || align=center|
|-
|align="left"| || align="center"|G/F || align="left"|Florida || align="center"|2 || align="center"|– || 141 || 3,290 || 385 || 212 || 1,515 || 23.3 || 2.7 || 1.5 || 10.7 || align=center|
|-
|align="left"| || align="center"|G || align="left"|Oregon || align="center"|1 || align="center"| || 29 || 841 || 78 || 150 || 346 || 29.0 || 2.7 || 5.2 || 11.9 || align=center|
|-
|align="left"| || align="center"|F || align="left"|Louisiana || align="center"|3 || align="center"|– || 126 || 1,031 || 141 || 48 || 417 || 8.2 || 1.1 || 0.4 || 3.3 || align=center|
|-
|align="left"| || align="center"|F || align="left"|La Salle || align="center"|1 || align="center"| || 16 || 133 || 44 || 13 || 43 || 8.3 || 2.8 || 0.8 || 2.7 || align=center|
|-
|align="left"| || align="center"|G || align="left"|UTSA || align="center"|1 || align="center"| || 3 || 71 || 11 || 5 || 18 || 23.7 || 3.7 || 1.7 || 6.0 || align=center|
|-
|align="left" bgcolor="#FFFF99"|^ || align="center"|G || align="left"|North Carolina || align="center"|2 || align="center"|– || 110 || 2,825 || 228 || 757 || 976 || 25.7 || 2.1 || 6.9 || 8.9 || align=center|
|-
|align="left"| || align="center"|C || align="left"|Kansas || align="center"|1 || align="center"| || 37 || 291 || 75 || 22 || 74 || 7.9 || 2.0 || 0.6 || 2.0 || align=center|
|-
|align="left"| || align="center"|F/C || align="left"|Seton Hall || align="center"|1 || align="center"| || 3 || 14 || 2 || 2 || 1 || 4.7 || 0.7 || 0.7 || 0.3 || align=center|
|-
|align="left"| || align="center"|G || align="left"|Clemson || align="center"|2 || align="center"|– || 143 || 3,280 || 417 || 260 || 923 || 22.9 || 2.9 || 1.8 || 6.5 || align=center|
|-
|align="left"| || align="center"|C || align="left"|Utah State || align="center"|1 || align="center"| || 23 || 225 || 58 || 2 || 93 || 9.8 || 2.5 || 0.1 || 4.0 || align=center|
|-
|align="left"| || align="center"|G || align="left"|Saint Louis || align="center"|1 || align="center"| || 6 || 53 || 3 || 11 || 16 || 8.8 || 0.5 || 1.8 || 2.7 || align=center|
|-
|align="left"| || align="center"|F || align="left"|Denver || align="center"|1 || align="center"| || 47 || 355 || 101 || 21 || 158 || 7.6 || 2.1 || 0.4 || 3.4 || align=center|
|}

C

|-
|align="left"| || align="center"|G || align="left"|USC || align="center"|3 || align="center"|– || 180 || 4,076 || 343 || 833 || 2,234 || 22.6 || 1.9 || 4.6 || 12.4 || align=center|
|-
|align="left"| || align="center"|F/C || align="left"|UMass || align="center"|6 || align="center"|– || 372 || 11,777 || 4,117 || 928 || 3,748 || 31.7 || 11.1 || 2.5 || 10.1 || align=center|
|-
|align="left" bgcolor="#CCFFCC"|x || align="center"|G || align="left"|Argentina || align="center"|1 || align="center"|  || 65 || 1425 || 134 || 232 || 396 || 21.9 || 2.1 || 3.6 || 5.9 || align=center|
|-
|align="left" bgcolor="#CCFFCC"|x || align="center"|F || align="left"|Slovenia || align="center"|2 || align="center"| – || 55 || 326 || 60 || 17 || 102 || 5.9 || 1.1 || 0.3 || 1.9 || align=center|
|-
|align="left"| || align="center"|G || align="left"|La Salle || align="center"|1 || align="center"| || 80 || 3,097 || 333 || 414 || 2,126 || 38.7 || 4.2 || 5.2 || 26.6 || align=center|
|-
|align="left"| || align="center"|F || align="left"|South Carolina State || align="center"|2 || align="center"|– || 77 || 1,479 || 337 || 79 || 583 || 19.2 || 4.4 || 1.0 || 7.6 || align=center|
|-
|align="left"| || align="center"|F || align="left"|Missouri || align="center"|1 || align="center"| || 4 || 21 || 3 || 3 || 12 || 5.3 || 0.8 || 0.8 || 3.0 || align=center|
|-
|align="left"| || align="center"|F/C || align="left"|Purdue || align="center"|1 || align="center"| || 30 || 719 || 193 || 54 || 358 || 24.0 || 6.4 || 1.8 || 11.9 || align=center|
|-
|align="left"| || align="center"|G || align="left"|Hawaii || align="center"|5 || align="center"|– || 218 || 4,796 || 509 || 949 || 1,169 || 22.0 || 2.3 || 4.4 || 5.4 || align=center|
|-
|align="left"| || align="center"|G || align="left"|LSU || align="center"|1 || align="center"| || 55 || 688 || 86 || 71 || 342 || 12.5 || 1.6 || 1.3 || 6.2 || align=center|
|-
|align="left"| || align="center"|F || align="left"|DePaul || align="center"|7 || align="center"|–– || 357 || 10,877 || 1,991 || 657 || 4,683 || 30.5 || 5.6 || 1.8 || 13.1 || align=center|
|-
|align="left"| || align="center"|G/F || align="left"|Western Kentucky || align="center"|1 || align="center"| || 47 || 1,049 || 143 || 107 || 468 || 22.3 || 3.0 || 2.3 || 10.0 || align=center|
|-
|align="left"| || align="center"|G/F || align="left"|Indiana || align="center"|2 || align="center"|– || 77 || 1,784 || 260 || 119 || 515 || 23.2 || 3.4 || 1.5 || 6.7 || align=center|
|-
|align="left"| || align="center"|F || align="left"|Cincinnati || align="center"|1 || align="center"| || 2 || 4 || 1 || 0 || 0 || 2.0 || 0.5 || 0.0 || 0.0 || align=center|
|-
|align="left"| || align="center"|G || align="left"|Belmont || align="center"|1 || align="center"| || 7 || 31 || 3 || 2 || 13 || 4.4 || 0.4 || 0.3 || 1.9 || align=center|
|-
|align="left"| || align="center"|F/C || align="left"|UNLV || align="center"|3 || align="center"|– || 144 || 3,011 || 787 || 115 || 1,014 || 20.9 || 5.5 || 0.8 || 7.0 || align=center|
|-
|align="left"| || align="center"|G || align="left"|BYU || align="center"|3 || align="center"|– || 183 || 3,838 || 360 || 640 || 1,259 || 21.0 || 2.0 || 3.5 || 6.9 || align=center|
|-
|align="left"| || align="center"|F/C || align="left"|Arizona || align="center"|2 || align="center"|– || 80 || 1,236 || 360 || 28 || 341 || 15.5 || 4.5 || 0.4 || 4.3 || align=center|
|-
|align="left"| || align="center"|G || align="left"|Portland || align="center"|1 || align="center"| || 30 || 386 || 48 || 43 || 161 || 12.9 || 1.6 || 1.4 || 5.4 || align=center|
|-
|align="left"| || align="center"|F || align="left"|Kansas || align="center"|1 || align="center"| || 2 || 10 || 3 || 1 || 2 || 5.0 || 1.5 || 0.5 || 1.0 || align=center|
|-
|align="left"| || align="center"|F || align="left"|Iowa || align="center"|1 || align="center"|  || 2 || 19 || 4 || 0 || 4 || 9.5 || 2.0 || 0.0 || 2.0 || align=center|
|-
|align="left"| || align="center"|F/C || align="left"|New Orleans || align="center"|5 || align="center"|– || 351 || 8,433 || 2,603 || 343 || 3,345 || 24.0 || 7.4 || 1.0 || 9.5 || align=center|
|-
|align="left"| || align="center"|G/F || align="left"|USC Upstate || align="center"|3 || align="center"|– || 172 || 3,204 || 579 || 144 || 908 || 18.6 || 3.4 || 0.8 || 5.3 || align=center|
|-
|align="left"| || align="center"|C || align="left"|North Carolina || align="center"|1 || align="center"| || 20 || 88 || 23 || 5 || 26 || 4.4 || 1.2 || 0.3 || 1.3 || align=center|
|-
|align="left"| || align="center"|G || align="left"|Virginia || align="center"|1 || align="center"| || 12 || 180 || 15 || 29 || 41 || 15.0 || 1.3 || 2.4 || 3.4 || align=center|
|-
|align="left"| || align="center"|C || align="left"|Serbia || align="center"|1 || align="center"| || 14 || 48 || 11 || 3 || 10 || 3.4 || 0.8 || 0.2 || 0.7 || align=center|
|}

D to E

|-
|align="left"| || align="center|G || align="left"|VCU || align="center"|1 || align="center"|  || 6 || 76 || 6 || 3 || 26 || 12.7 || 1.0 || .5 || 4.3 || align=center|
|-
|align="left"| || align="center"|F/C || align="left"|Virginia Union || align="center"|1 || align="center"| || 19 || 228 || 53 || 7 || 33 || 12.0 || 2.8 || 0.4 || 1.7 || align=center|
|-
|align="left"| || align="center"|G/F || align="left"|North Carolina || align="center"|4 || align="center"|– || 235 || 5,277 || 523 || 497 || 3,659 || 22.5 || 2.2 || 2.1 || 15.6 || align=center|
|-
|align="left"| || align="center"|F || align="left"|Duke || align="center"|1 || align="center"| || 43 || 413 || 101 || 45 || 90 || 9.6 || 2.3 || 1.0 || 2.1 || align=center|
|-
|align="left"| || align="center"|G/F || align="left"|Pepperdine || align="center"|2 || align="center"|– || 118 || 1,719 || 172 || 92 || 437 || 14.6 || 1.5 || 0.8 || 3.7 || align=center|
|-
|align="left"| || align="center"|C || align="left"|Utah || align="center"|1 || align="center"| || 26 || 344 || 76 || 14 || 94 || 13.2 || 2.9 || 0.5 || 3.6 || align=center|
|-
|align="left"| || align="center"|F || align="left"|Georgia || align="center"|1 || align="center"| || 7 || 37 || 20 || 2 || 9 || 5.3 || 2.9 || 0.3 || 1.3 || align=center|
|-
|align="left" bgcolor="#CCFFCC"|x || align="center"|G/F || align="left"|South Carolina || align="center"|2 || align="center"|– || 79 || 1,500 || 237 || 155 || 553 || 19.0 || 3.0 || 2.0 || 7.0 || align=center|
|-
|align="left"| || align="center"|G/F || align="left"|Alabama || align="center"|10 || align="center"|–– || 734 || 18,322 || 3,496 || 1,311 || 3,585 || 25.0 || 4.8 || 1.8 || 4.9 || align=center|
|-
|align="left"| || align="center"|G || align="left"|Purdue || align="center"|1 || align="center"| || 15 || 101 || 18 || 7 || 64 || 6.7 || 1.2 || 0.5 || 4.3 || align=center|
|-
|align="left"| || align="center"|G || align="left"|Boston College || align="center"|1 || align="center"| || 19 || 282 || 19 || 44 || 92 || 14.8 || 1.0 || 2.3 || 4.8 || align=center|
|-
|align="left"| || align="center"|F || align="left"|Marquette || align="center"|3 || align="center"|– || 168 || 1,984 || 482 || 113 || 613 || 11.8 || 2.9 || 0.7 || 3.6 || align=center|
|-
|align="left"| || align="center"|G/F || align="left"|Tennessee || align="center"|3 || align="center"|– || 244 || 7,562 || 830 || 361 || 3,483 || 31.0 || 3.4 || 1.5 || 14.3 || align=center|
|-
|align="left"| || align="center"|G || align="left"|Morehouse || align="center"|1 || align="center"| || 27 || 344 || 50 || 18 || 164 || 12.7 || 1.9 || 0.7 || 6.1 || align=center|
|-
|align="left"| || align="center"|F || align="left"|Notre Dame || align="center"|6 || align="center"|– || 343 || 11,352 || 2,695 || 740 || 5,201 || 33.1 || 7.9 || 2.2 || 15.2 || align=center|
|-
|align="left"| || align="center"|C || align="left"|California || align="center"|3 || align="center"|– || 201 || 3,393 || 743 || 113 || 818 || 16.9 || 3.7 || 0.6 || 4.1 || align=center|
|-
|align="left"| || align="center"|C || align="left"|Fresno State || align="center"|1 || align="center"| || 30 || 366 || 74 || 14 || 69 || 12.2 || 2.5 || 0.5 || 2.3 || align=center|
|-
|align="left"| || align="center"|F || align="left"|UC Irvine || align="center"|1 || align="center"| || 11 || 50 || 16 || 7 || 28 || 4.5 || 1.5 || 0.6 || 2.5 || align=center|
|-
|align="left" bgcolor="#FFFF99"|^ (#2) || align="center"|F || align="left"|South Carolina || align="center" bgcolor="#CFECEC"|11 || align="center"|– || bgcolor="#CFECEC"|837 || bgcolor="#CFECEC"|29,893 || 4,686 || bgcolor="#CFECEC"|3,679 || bgcolor="#CFECEC"|21,645 || 35.7 || 5.6 || 4.4 || 25.9 || align=center|
|-
|align="left"| || align="center"|G || align="left"|Kansas State || align="center"|6 || align="center"|– || 419 || 7,431 || 592 || 1,075 || 3,642 || 17.7 || 1.4 || 2.6 || 8.7 || align=center|
|-
|align="left"| || align="center"|F || align="left"|Iowa || align="center"|2 || align="center"|– || 92 || 1,732 || 686 || 60 || 460 || 18.8 || 7.5 || 0.7 || 5.0 || align=center|
|}

F to G

|-
|align="left"| || align="center"|F || align="left"|BYU || align="center"|1 || align="center"| || 11 || 135 || 18 || 9 || 40 || 12.3 || 1.6 || 0.8 || 3.6 || align=center|
|-
|align="left"| || align="center"|F || align="left"|Morehead State || align="center"|7 || align="center"|– || 441 || 11,000 || 3,634 || 450 || 5,046 || 24.9 || 8.2 || 1.0 || 11.4 || align=center|
|-
|align="left"| || align="center"|G || align="left"|Alabama || align="center"|2 || align="center"| || 29 || 472 || 65 || 42 || 253 || 16.3 || 2.2 || 1.4 || 8.7 || align=center|
|-
|align="left"| || align="center"|G || align="left"|North Carolina || align="center"|1 || align="center"| || 21 || 663 || 75 || 137 || 241 || 31.6 || 3.6 || 6.5 || 11.5 || align=center|
|-
|align="left"| || align="center"|G || align="left"|Spain || align="center"|1 || align="center"| || 31 || 710 || 65 || 75 || 268 || 22.9 || 2.1 || 2.4 || 8.6 || align=center|
|-
|align="left"| || align="center"|C || align="left"|UNC Wilmington || align="center"|1 || align="center"| || 16 || 117 || 18 || 7 || 40 || 7.3 || 1.1 || 0.4 || 2.5 || align=center|
|-
|align="left"| || align="center"|G || align="left"|Manhattan || align="center"|1 || align="center"| || 1 || 4 || 1 || 0 || 3 || 4.0 || 1.0 || 0.0 || 3.0 || align=center|
|-
|align="left"| || align="center"|F || align="left"|UMass || align="center"|1 || align="center"| || 63 || 791 || 116 || 49 || 326 || 12.6 || 1.8 || 0.8 || 5.2 || align=center|
|-
|align="left"| || align="center"|F || align="left"|Cincinnati || align="center"|2 || align="center"|– || 130 || 3,228 || 1,029 || 108 || 1,366 || 24.8 || 7.9 || 0.8 || 10.5 || align=center|
|-
|align="left"| || align="center"|G || align="left"|UConn || align="center"|1 || align="center"| || 48 || 352 || 42 || 47 || 148 || 7.3 || 0.9 || 1.0 || 3.1 || align=center|
|-
|align="left"| || align="center"|G/F || align="left"|France || align="center"|2 || align="center"|– || 114 || 1,931 || 237 || 156 || 840 || 16.9 || 2.1 || 1.4 || 7.4 || align=center|
|-
|align="left"| || align="center"|G || align="left"|Villanova || align="center"|3 || align="center"|– || 185 || 4,642 || 422 || 518 || 1,826 || 25.1 || 2.3 || 2.8 || 9.9 || align=center|
|-
|align="left"| || align="center"|G || align="left"|San Diego State || align="center"|1 || align="center"| || 3 || 13 || 2 || 3 || 3 || 4.3 || 0.7 || 1.0 || 1.0 || align=center|
|-
|align="left"| || align="center"|G || align="left"|Loyola Marymount || align="center"|1 || align="center"| || 10 || 226 || 14 || 91 || 83 || 22.6 || 1.4 || 9.1 || 8.3 || align=center|
|-
|align="left"| || align="center"|F || align="left"|Italy || align="center"|6 || align="center"|–– || 303 || 9,492 || 1,469 || 667 || 4,898 || 31.3 || 4.8 || 2.2 || 16.2 || align=center|
|-
|align="left"| || align="center"|F || align="left"|Colorado || align="center"|1 || align="center"| || 42 || 487 || 136 || 13 || 197 || 11.6 || 3.2 || 0.3 || 4.7 || align=center|
|-
|align="left"| || align="center"|G || align="left"|DePaul || align="center"|1 || align="center"| || 78 || 1,106 || 138 || 145 || 334 || 14.2 || 1.8 || 1.9 || 4.3 || align=center|
|-
|align="left"| || align="center"|G || align="left"|Missouri State || align="center"|1 || align="center"| || 78 || 2,209 || 190 || 411 || 846 || 28.3 || 2.4 || 5.3 || 10.8 || align=center|
|-
|align="left"| || align="center"|C || align="left"|Indiana || align="center"|1 || align="center"| || 82 || 2,632 || 644 || 90 || 598 || 32.1 || 7.9 || 1.1 || 7.3 || align=center|
|-
|align="left"| || align="center"|G || align="left"|Illinois || align="center"|1 || align="center"| || 28 || 225 || 19 || 28 || 68 || 8.0 || 0.7 || 1.0 || 2.4 || align=center|
|-
|align="left"| || align="center"|F/C || align="left"|Old Dominion || align="center"|1 || align="center"| || 40 || 770 || 205 || 31 || 416 || 19.3 || 5.1 || 0.8 || 10.4 || align=center|
|-
|align="left"| || align="center"|G || align="left"|Alabama || align="center"|2 || align="center"| || 52 || 600 || 85 || 25 || 201 || 11.5 || 1.6 || 0.5 || 3.9 || align=center|
|-
|align="left"| || align="center"|G/F || align="left"|Virginia || align="center"|2 || align="center"|– || 84 || 1,641 || 401 || 171 || 834 || 19.5 || 4.8 || 2.0 || 9.9 || align=center|
|-
|align="left"| || align="center"|G || align="left"|Houston || align="center"|3 || align="center"|– || 129 || 3,025 || 205 || 436 || 1,030 || 23.4 || 1.6 || 3.4 || 8.0 || align=center|
|-
|align="left"| || align="center"|G/F || align="left"|UNLV || align="center"|4 || align="center"|– || 288 || 4,926 || 1,290 || 416 || 1,822 || 17.1 || 4.5 || 1.4 || 6.3 || align=center|
|-
|align="left"| || align="center"|G || align="left"|Florida Gulf Coast || align="center"|1 || align="center"| || 16 || 57 || 3 || 14 || 23 || 3.6 || 0.2 || 0.9 || 1.4 || align=center|
|-
|align="left" bgcolor="#CCFFCC"|x || align="center"|F || align="left"|Arizona || align="center"|1 || align="center"| || 25 || 648 || 118 || 56 || 254 || 25.9 || 4.7 || 2.2 || 10.2 || align=center|
|-
|align="left"| || align="center"|F || align="left"|Oklahoma State || align="center"|1 || align="center"| || 63 || 759 || 123 || 22 || 266 || 12.0 || 2.0 || 0.3 || 4.2 || align=center|
|-
|align="left"| || align="center"|G || align="left"|TCNJ || align="center"|2 || align="center"|– || 24 || 260 || 16 || 57 || 45 || 10.8 || 0.7 || 2.4 || 1.9 || align=center|
|-
|-
|align="left"| || align="center"|F || align="left"|Syracuse || align="center"|1 || align="center"| || 71 || 1,892 || 248 || 88 || 851 || 26.6 || 3.5 || 1.2 || 12.0 || align=center|
|-
|align="left"| || align="center"|G || align="left"|Virginia Tech || align="center"|2 || align="center"|– || 46 || 417 || 32 || 40 || 146 || 9.1 || 0.7 || 0.9 || 3.2 || align=center|
|-
|align="left" bgcolor="#CCFFCC"| || align="center"|F/C || align="left"|Alabama || align="center"|1 || align="center"| || 58 || 1,120 || 277 || 53 || 471 || 19.3 || 4.8 || 0.9 || 8.1 || align=center|
|-
|align="left"| || align="center"|F/C || align="left"|Louisiana Tech || align="center"|2 || align="center"|– || 160 || 4,205 || 1,333 || 165 || 2,315 || 26.3 || 8.3 || 1.0 || 14.5 || align=center|
|-
|align="left"| || align="center"|G || align="left"|Florida || align="center"|1 || align="center"| || 9 || 30 || 6 || 3 || 10 || 3.3 || 0.7 || 0.3 || 1.1 || align=center|
|-
|align="left"| || align="center"|F/C || align="left"|UCLA || align="center"|1 || align="center"| || 29 || 491 || 164 || 41 || 172 || 16.9 || 5.7 || 1.4 || 5.9 || align=center|
|}

H

|-
|align="left"| || align="center"|F || align="left"|Texas Tech || align="center"|1 || align="center"| || 35 || 313 || 56 || 14 || 80 || 8.9 || 1.6 || 0.4 || 2.3 || align=center|
|-
|align="left"| || align="center"|G/F || align="left"|Texas || align="center"|3 || align="center"|– || 105 || 1,325 || 290 || 77 || 589 || 12.6 || 2.8 || 0.7 || 5.6 || align=center|
|-
|align="left"| || align="center"|F/C || align="left"|St. John's || align="center"|1 || align="center"| || 54 || 848 || 253 || 14 || 324 || 15.7 || 4.7 || 0.3 || 6.0 || align=center|
|-
|align="left"| || align="center"|F || align="left"|Tulsa || align="center"|5 || align="center"|– || 329 || 8,039 || 2,036 || 421 || 3,547 || 24.4 || 6.2 || 1.3 || 10.8 || align=center|
|-
|align="left"| || align="center"|F || align="left"|Georgia Tech || align="center"|5 || align="center"|– || 331 || 5,207 || 1,141 || 173 || 1,764 || 15.7 || 3.4 || 0.5 || 5.3 || align=center|
|-
|align="left"| || align="center"|G || align="left"|New Zealand || align="center"|1 || align="center"| || 25 || 233 || 50 || 14 || 64 || 9.3 || 2.0 || 0.6 || 2.6 || align=center|
|-
|align="left"| || align="center"|G/F || align="left"|Notre Dame || align="center"|8 || align="center"|– || 593 || 12,301 || 1,639 || 1,764 || 4,546 || 20.7 || 2.8 || 3.0 || 7.7 || align=center|
|-
|align="left"| || align="center"|G || align="left"|UTEP || align="center"|1 || align="center"| || 14 || 325 || 27 || 77 || 134 || 23.2 || 1.9 || 5.5 || 9.6 || align=center|
|-
|align="left"| || align="center"|G || align="left"|Auburn || align="center"|1 || align="center"| || 6 || 74 || 6 || 10 || 19 || 12.3 || 1.0 || 1.7 || 3.2 || align=center|
|-
|align="left"| || align="center"|F || align="left"|St. Patrick HS (NJ) || align="center"|2 || align="center"|– || 137 || 3,426 || 722 || 189 || 1,675 || 25.0 || 5.3 || 1.4 || 12.2 || align=center|
|-
|align="left"| || align="center"|G || align="left"|Wingate || align="center"|1 || align="center"| || 82 || 2,003 || 250 || 277 || 418 || 24.4 || 3.0 || 3.4 || 5.1 || align=center|
|-
|align="left"| || align="center"|G || align="left"|Wisconsin || align="center"|1 || align="center"| || 27 || 533 || 42 || 67 || 222 || 19.7 || 1.6 || 2.5 || 8.2 || align=center|
|-
|align="left" | || align="center"|G || align="left"|Michigan State || align="center"|7 || align="center"|– || 387 || 11,244 || 1,008 || 811 || 4,643 || 29.1 || 2.6 || 2.1 || 12.0 || align=center|
|-
|align="left" bgcolor="#CCFFCC"|x || align="center"|G || align="left"|Tulsa || align="center"|1 || align="center"|  || 17 || 277 || 39 || 16 || 56 || 16.3 || 2.3 || 0.9 || 3.3 || align=center|
|-
|align="left"| || align="center"|G || align="left"|Syracuse || align="center"|1 || align="center"| || 11 || 36 || 4 || 5 || 13 || 3.3 || 0.4 || 0.5 || 1.2 || align=center|
|-
|align="left" | || align="center"|C || align="left"|Germany || align="center"|1 || align="center"| || 30 || 272 || 85 || 15 || 104 || 9.1 || 2.8 || 0.5 || 3.5 || align=center|
|-
|align="left"| || align="center"|F || align="left"|Florida || align="center"|2 || align="center"|– || 106 || 2,292 || 590 || 132 || 843 || 21.6 || 5.6 || 1.2 || 8.0 || align=center|
|-
|align="left"| || align="center"|F/C || align="left"|Arkansas || align="center"|2 || align="center"|– || 116 || 1,091 || 235 || 60 || 214 || 9.4 || 2.0 || 0.5 || 1.8 || align=center|
|-
|align="left" bgcolor="#FFFF99"|^ || align="center"|F/C || align="left"|Detroit Mercy || align="center"|1 || align="center"| || 84 || 3,808 || 1,637 || 190 || 2,519 || bgcolor="#CFECEC"|45.3 || bgcolor="#CFECEC"|19.5 || 2.3 || bgcolor="#CFECEC"|30.0 || align=center|
|-
|align="left"| || align="center"|F || align="left"|Spain || align="center"|4 || align="center"|– || 191 || 2,899 || 601 || 118 || 902 || 15.2 || 3.1 || 0.6 || 4.7 || align=center|
|-
|align="left"| || align="center"|G || align="left"|Fresno State || align="center"|1 || align="center"| || 45 || 597 || 52 || 111 || 141 || 13.3 || 1.2 || 2.5 || 3.1 || align=center|
|-
|align="left"| || align="center"|F || align="left"|Houston || align="center"|1 || align="center"| || 24 || 265 || 54 || 1 || 59 || 11.0 || 2.3 || 0.0 || 2.5 || align=center|
|-
|align="left"| || align="center"|F || align="left"|LSU || align="center"|1 || align="center"| || 35 || 462 || 198 || 30 || 205 || 13.2 || 5.7 || 0.9 || 5.9 || align=center|
|-
|align="left"| || align="center"|C || align="left"|Georgetown || align="center"|1 || align="center"| || 6 || 11 || 2 || 1 || 4 || 1.8 || 0.3 || 0.2 || 0.7 || align=center|
|-
|align="left"| || align="center"|F || align="left"|Tulane || align="center"|1 || align="center"| || 20 || 128 || 28 || 8 || 39 || 6.4 || 1.4 || 0.4 || 2.0 || align=center|
|-
|align="left"| || align="center"|F/C || align="left"|NC State || align="center"|3 || align="center"|– || 162 || 3,575 || 1,171 || 169 || 1,503 || 22.1 || 7.2 || 1.0 || 9.3 || align=center|
|-
|align="left"| || align="center"|F || align="left"|Northern Colorado || align="center"|1 || align="center"| || 5 || 32 || 3 || 2 || 13 || 6.4 || 0.6 || 0.4 || 2.6 || align=center|
|-
|align="left"| || align="center"|G || align="left"|LSU || align="center"|2 || align="center"|– || 148 || 3,385 || 289 || 803 || 1,131 || 22.9 || 2.0 || 5.4 || 7.6 || align=center|
|-
|align="left"| || align="center"|F/C || align="left"|Kansas || align="center"|2 || align="center"|– || 141 || 4,777 || 1,177 || 346 || 2,215 || 33.9 || 8.3 || 2.5 || 15.7 || align=center|
|-
|align="left"| || align="center"|F/C || align="left"|San Jose State || align="center"|1 || align="center"| || 33 || 746 || 239 || 53 || 257 || 22.6 || 7.2 || 1.6 || 7.8 || align=center|
|-
|align="left"| || align="center"|G || align="left"|NC State || align="center"|2 || align="center"|– || 18 || 70 || 10 || 16 || 19 || 3.9 || 0.6 || 0.9 || 1.1 || align=center|
|-
|align="left"| || align="center"|C || align="left"|Villanova || align="center"|1 || align="center"| || 70 || 1,588 || 491 || 64 || 454 || 22.7 || 7.0 || 0.9 || 6.5 || align=center|
|-
|align="left"| || align="center"|F/C || align="left"|South Carolina || align="center"|2 || align="center"|– || 145 || 2,971 || 853 || 169 || 1,099 || 20.5 || 5.9 || 1.2 || 7.6 || align=center|
|-
|align="left"| || align="center"|F || align="left"|Indiana || align="center"|1 || align="center"| || 1 || 6 || 1 || 0 || 2 || 6.0 || 1.0 || 0.0 || 2.0 || align=center|
|-
|align="left"| || align="center"|F || align="left"|Michigan || align="center"|3 || align="center"|– || 108 || 3,728 || 811 || 312 || 1,921 || 34.5 || 7.5 || 2.9 || 17.8 || align=center|
|-
|align="left" bgcolor="#CCFFCC"|x || align="center"|G || align="left"|Marquette || align="center"|1 || align="center"| || 37 || 205 || 21 || 18 || 105 || 5.5 || 0.6 || 0.5 || 2.8 || align=center|
|-
|align="left"| || align="center"|G || align="left"|Colorado State || align="center"|2 || align="center"|– || 86 || 1,116 || 89 || 151 || 279 || 13.0 || 1.0 || 1.8 || 3.2 || align=center|
|-
|align="left"| || align="center"|C || align="left"|Wisconsin || align="center"|3 || align="center"|– || 159 || 2,453 || 711 || 159 || 456 || 15.4 || 4.5 || 1.0 || 2.9 || align=center|
|-
|align="left"| || align="center"|C || align="left"|DePaul || align="center"|1 || align="center"| || 19 || 120 || 29 || 0 || 39 || 6.3 || 1.5 || 0.0 || 2.1 || align=center|
|}

I to J

|-
|align="left"| || align="center"|G/F || align="left"|Arizona || align="center"|1 || align="center"| || 80 || 2,779 || 423 || 433 || 1,038 || 34.7 || 5.3 || 5.4 || 13.0 || align=center|
|-
|align="left"| || align="center"|G/F || align="left"|Washington || align="center"|1 || align="center"| || 3 || 14 || 1 || 0 || 4 || 4.7 || 0.3 || 0.0 || 1.3 || align=center|
|-
|align="left" bgcolor="#FFFF99"|^ (#44) || align="center"|F/C || align="left"|Kentucky || align="center"|10 || align="center"|– || 802 || 25,198 || bgcolor="#CFECEC"|6,630 || 2,005 || 16,589 || 31.4 || 8.3 || 2.5 || 20.7 || align=center|
|-
|align="left" bgcolor="#FFFF99"|^ || align="center"|G || align="left"|Georgetown || align="center"|3 || align="center"|– || 135 || 5,668 || 403 || 965 || 3,461 || 42.0 || 3.0 || 7.1 || 25.6 || align=center|
|-
|align="left"| || align="center"|G/F || align="left"|Wichita State || align="center"|2 || align="center"|– || 131 || 4,449 || 670 || 897 || 2,177 || 34.0 || 5.1 || 6.8 || 16.6 || align=center|
|-
|align="left"| || align="center"|G || align="left"|Minnesota || align="center"|1 || align="center"| || 68 || 2,042 || 302 || 317 || 790 || 30.0 || 4.4 || 4.7 || 11.6 || align=center|
|-
|align="left"| || align="center"|G || align="left"|St. John's || align="center"|1 || align="center"| || 52 || 2,001 || 271 || 641 || 541 || 38.5 || 5.2 || bgcolor="#CFECEC"|12.3 || 10.4 || align=center|
|-
|align="left"| || align="center"|F || align="left"|Arizona || align="center"|1 || align="center"| || 20 || 163 || 17 || 15 || 30 || 8.2 || 0.9 || 0.8 || 1.5 || align=center|
|-
|align="left"| || align="center"|G || align="left"|Southern || align="center"|2 || align="center"| || 72 || 1,417 || 85 || 335 || 560 || 19.7 || 1.2 || 4.7 || 7.8 || align=center|
|-
|align="left"| || align="center"|F || align="left"|Cincinnati || align="center"|3 || align="center"|– || 168 || 2,575 || 304 || 147 || 992 || 15.3 || 1.8 || 0.9 || 5.9 || align=center|
|-
|align="left"| || align="center"|C || align="left"|New Orleans || align="center"|1 || align="center"| || 82 || 2,599 || 913 || 71 || 582 || 31.7 || 11.1 || 0.9 || 7.1 || align=center|
|-
|align="left"| || align="center"|F/C || align="left"|St. John's || align="center"|1 || align="center"| || 75 || 1,938 || 584 || 157 || 768 || 25.8 || 7.8 || 2.1 || 10.2 || align=center|
|-
|align="left" bgcolor="#FBCEB1"|* || align="center"|F/C || align="left"|Serbia || align="center"|6 || align="center"|– || 453 || 13,542 || 4,437 || 2,697 || 8,360 || 29.9 || 9.8 || 6.0 || 18.5 || align=center|
|-
|align="left" bgcolor="#FFFF99"|^ || align="center"|F || align="left"|North Carolina || align="center"|4 || align="center"|– || 324 || 10,410 || 2,797 || 1,150 || 4,806 || 32.1 || 8.6 || 3.5 || 14.8 || align=center|
|-
|align="left"| || align="center"|F || align="left"|Washington || align="center"|1 || align="center"| || 25 || 222 || 38 || 11 || 84 || 8.9 || 1.5 || 0.4 || 3.4 || align=center|
|-
|align="left"| || align="center"|G/F || align="left"|Duke || align="center"|1 || align="center"| || 79 || 1,426 || 168 || 78 || 429 || 18.1 || 2.1 || 1.0 || 5.4 || align=center|
|-
|align="left"| || align="center"|G/F || align="left"|Toledo || align="center"|3 || align="center"|– || 226 || 9,154 || 1,483 || 954 || 5,745 || 40.5 || 6.6 || 4.2 || 25.4 || align=center|
|-
|align="left"| || align="center"|F || align="left"|Murray State || align="center"|1 || align="center"| || 40 || 330 || 103 || 19 || 104 || 8.3 || 2.6 || 0.5 || 2.6 || align=center|
|-
|align="left"| || align="center"|G/F || align="left"|Oregon || align="center"|1 || align="center"| || 42 || 1,157 || 139 || 128 || 575 || 27.5 || 3.3 || 3.0 || 13.7 || align=center|
|-
|align="left"| || align="center"|G || align="left"|Kansas || align="center"|1 || align="center"| || 6 || 79 || 6 || 19 || 15 || 13.2 || 1.0 || 3.2 || 2.5 || align=center|
|-
|align="left"| || align="center"|C || align="left"|Saint Rose || align="center"|1 || align="center"| || 2 || 8 || 0 || 0 || 0 || 4.0 || 0.0 || 0.0 || 0.0 || align=center|
|}

K to L

|-
|align="left"| || align="center"|F/C || align="left"|Stanford || align="center"|1 || align="center"| || 38 || 565 || 172 || 59 || 173 || 14.9 || 4.5 || 1.6 || 4.6 || align=center|
|-
|align="left"| || align="center"|F/C || align="left"|Notre Dame || align="center"|1 || align="center"| || 71 || 1,061 || 218 || 118 || 383 || 14.9 || 3.1 || 1.7 || 5.4 || align=center|
|-
|align="left"| || align="center"|F/C || align="left"|Alcorn State || align="center"|5 || align="center"|– || 406 || 13,443 || 4,547 || 655 || 3,131 || 33.1 || 11.2 || 1.6 || 7.7 || align=center|
|-
|align="left"| || align="center"|G || align="left"|Cincinnati || align="center"|1 || align="center"| || 8 || 82 || 6 || 3 || 27 || 10.3 || 0.8 || 0.4 || 3.4 || align=center|
|-
|align="left"| || align="center"|G || align="left"|Michigan || align="center"|1 || align="center"| || 2 || 22 || 2 || 2 || 6 || 11.0 || 1.0 || 1.0 || 3.0 || align=center|
|-
|align="left"| || align="center"|F || align="left"|Missouri || align="center"|4 || align="center"|– || 301 || 5,720 || 1,042 || 219 || 2,504 || 19.0 || 3.5 || 0.7 || 8.3 || align=center|
|-
|align="left"| || align="center"|F || align="left"|Detroit Mercy || align="center"|1 || align="center"| || 42 || 308 || 86 || 29 || 145 || 7.3 || 2.0 || 0.7 || 3.5 || align=center|
|-
|align="left"| || align="center"|C || align="left"|Ohio State || align="center"|3 || align="center"|– || 140 || 2,707 || 853 || 47 || 965 || 19.3 || 6.1 || 0.3 || 6.9 || align=center|
|-
|align="left"| || align="center"|C || align="left"|Augustana University || align="center"|1 || align="center"| || 8 || 45 || 12 || 3 || 16 || 5.6 || 1.5 || 0.4 || 2.0 || align=center|
|-
|align="left"| || align="center"|G || align="left"|North Carolina || align="center"|1 || align="center"| || 33 || 212 || 13 || 37 || 45 || 6.4 || 0.4 || 1.1 || 1.4 || align=center|
|-
|align="left"| || align="center"|F/C || align="left"|Kansas || align="center"|4 || align="center"|– || 222 || 6,947 || 1,718 || 272 || 2,939 || 31.3 || 7.7 || 1.2 || 13.2 || align=center|
|-
|align="left"| || align="center"|F/C || align="left"|North Carolina || align="center"|1 || align="center"| || 77 || 868 || 214 || 47 || 306 || 11.3 || 2.8 || 0.6 || 4.0 || align=center|
|-
|align="left"| || align="center"|F || align="left"|Pittsburgh || align="center"|4 || align="center"|– || 192 || 3,030 || 1,183 || 301 || 1,086 || 15.8 || 6.2 || 1.6 || 5.7 || align=center|
|-
|align="left"| || align="center"|C || align="left"|Central State || align="center"|1 || align="center"| || 39 || 345 || 100 || 21 || 144 || 8.8 || 2.6 || 0.5 || 3.7 || align=center|
|-
|align="left"| || align="center"|F/C || align="left"|France || align="center"|2 || align="center"|– || 83 || 1,309 || 367 || 69 || 558 || 15.8 || 4.4 || 0.8 || 6.7 || align=center|
|-
|align="left"| || align="center"|G || align="left"|North Carolina || align="center"|6 || align="center"|– || 416 || 12,945 || 1,207 || 2,745 || 5,923 || 31.1 || 2.9 || 6.6 || 14.2 || align=center|
|-
|align="left"| || align="center"|G || align="left"|La Salle || align="center"|1 || align="center"| || 10 || 148 || 18 || 12 || 58 || 14.8 || 1.8 || 1.2 || 5.8 || align=center|
|-
|align="left"| || align="center"|G || align="left"|Minnesota || align="center"|5 || align="center"|–– || 239 || 6,521 || 648 || 495 || 2,951 || 27.3 || 2.7 || 2.1 || 12.3 || align=center|
|-
|align="left" bgcolor="#FFCC00"|+ (#12) || align="center"|G || align="left"|Arizona State || align="center"|6 || align="center"|– || 474 || 16,867 || 3,621 || 3,566 || 8,081 || 35.6 || 7.6 || 7.5 || 17.0 || align=center|
|-
|align="left"| || align="center"|F || align="left"|Wichita State || align="center"|1 || align="center"| || 57 || 469 || 124 || 27 || 129 || 8.2 || 2.2 || 0.5 || 2.3 || align=center|
|-
|align="left"| || align="center"|F || align="left"|Illinois || align="center"|4 || align="center"|– || 232 || 4,294 || 869 || 229 || 1,842 || 18.5 || 3.7 || 1.0 || 7.9 || align=center|
|-
|align="left"| || align="center"|G/F || align="left"|Stanford || align="center"|4 || align="center"|– || 224 || 4,114 || 483 || 314 || 1,812 || 18.4 || 2.2 || 1.4 || 8.1 || align=center|
|-
|align="left"| || align="center"|F/C || align="left"|New Mexico || align="center"|2 || align="center"|– || 138 || 3,108 || 756 || 143 || 1,540 || 22.5 || 5.5 || 1.0 || 11.2 || align=center|
|-
|align="left"| || align="center"|F || align="left"|Syracuse || align="center"|2 || align="center"|– || 26 || 96 || 18 || 6 || 23 || 3.7 || 0.7 || 0.2 || 0.9 || align=center|
|-
|align="left"| || align="center"|F || align="left"|Kentucky || align="center"|2 || align="center"|– || 137 || 2,511 || 593 || 178 || 1,270 || 18.3 || 4.3 || 1.3 || 9.3 || align=center|
|-
|align="left"| || align="center"|G || align="left"|Oklahoma Baptist || align="center"|1 || align="center"| || 7 || 39 || 5 || 0 || 17 || 5.6 || 0.7 || 0.0 || 2.4 || align=center|
|-
|align="left"| || align="center"|F || align="left"|Wilberforce || align="center"|1 || align="center"| || 12 || 140 || 50 || 4 || 48 || 11.7 || 4.2 || 0.3 || 4.0 || align=center|
|}

M

|-
|align="left"| || align="center"|F || align="left"|UCLA || align="center"|1 || align="center"| || 56 || 1,107 || 205 || 89 || 625 || 19.8 || 3.7 || 1.6 || 11.2 || align=center|
|-
|align="left"| || align="center"|G || align="left"|Temple || align="center"|3 || align="center"|– || 131 || 3,571 || 330 || 305 || 1,199 || 27.3 || 2.5 || 2.3 || 9.2 || align=center|
|-
|align="left"| || align="center"|G/F || align="left"|Iowa || align="center"|1 || align="center"| || 5 || 32 || 8 || 1 || 4 || 6.4 || 1.6 || 0.2 || 0.8 || align=center|
|-
|align="left" bgcolor="#FFFF99"|^ || align="center"|G || align="left"|Soviet Union || align="center"|1 || align="center"| || 17 || 255 || 30 || 25 || 116 || 15.0 || 1.8 || 1.5 || 6.8 || align=center|
|-
|align="left"| || align="center"|F || align="left"|Cincinnati || align="center"|7 || align="center"|– || 371 || 11,370 || 2,583 || 690 || 4,553 || 30.6 || 7.0 || 1.9 || 12.3 || align=center|
|-
|align="left"| || align="center"|G/F || align="left"|Saint Joseph's || align="center"|2 || align="center"|– || 69 || 422 || 65 || 49 || 204 || 6.1 || 0.9 || 0.7 || 3.0 || align=center|
|-
|align="left"| || align="center"|F || align="left"|Tennessee State || align="center"|1 || align="center"| || 3 || 21 || 5 || 0 || 10 || 7.0 || 1.7 || 0.0 || 3.3 || align=center|
|-
|align="left"| || align="center"|G/F || align="left"|Southern Miss || align="center"|1 || align="center"| || 2 || 4 || 3 || 0 || 4 || 2.0 || 1.5 || 0.0 || 2.0 || align=center|
|-
|align="left"| || align="center"|G || align="left"|Tennessee State || align="center"|1 || align="center"| || 72 || 2,002 || 229 || 324 || 589 || 27.8 || 3.2 || 4.5 || 8.2 || align=center|
|-
|align="left"| || align="center"|C || align="left"|Northern Arizona || align="center"|1 || align="center"| || 6 || 58 || 17 || 1 || 18 || 9.7 || 2.8 || 0.2 || 3.0 || align=center|
|-
|align="left"| || align="center"|G/F || align="left"|Florida State || align="center"|3 || align="center"|– || 223 || 5,955 || 760 || 729 || 2,120 || 26.7 || 3.4 || 3.3 || 9.5 || align=center|
|-
|align="left"| || align="center"|C || align="left"|UCLA || align="center"|1 || align="center"| || 6 || 33 || 7 || 0 || 3 || 5.5 || 1.2 || 0.0 || 0.5 || align=center|
|-
|align="left" bgcolor="#FFCC00"|+ || align="center"|F/C || align="left"|Alabama || align="center"|6 || align="center"|–– || 361 || 12,271 || 3,231 || 586 || 6,555 || 34.0 || 9.0 || 1.6 || 18.2 || align=center|
|-
|align="left"| || align="center"|G/F || align="left"|Saint Joseph's || align="center"|2 || align="center"|– || 137 || 1,702 || 254 || 180 || 815 || 12.4 || 1.9 || 1.3 || 5.9 || align=center|
|-
|align="left" bgcolor="#CCFFCC"|x || align="center"|C || align="left"|Nevada || align="center"|4 || align="center"|– || 134 || 2,293 || 630 || 46 || 1,117 || 17.1 || 4.7 || 0.3 || 8.3 || align=center|
|-
|align="left"| || align="center"|F/C || align="left"|Utah || align="center"|1 || align="center"| || 78 || 1,760 || 460 || 102 || 1,002 || 22.6 || 5.9 || 1.3 || 12.8 || align=center|
|-
|align="left" bgcolor="#FFFF99"|^ || align="center"|F/C || align="left"|Indiana || align="center"|2 || align="center"|– || 121 || 3,976 || 1,326 || 504 || 2,418 || 32.9 || 11.0 || 4.2 || 20.0 || align=center|
|-
|align="left"| || align="center"|G || align="left"|North Carolina || align="center"|1 || align="center"| || 13 || 117 || 6 || 18 || 65 || 9.0 || 0.5 || 1.4 || 5.0 || align=center|
|-
|align="left"| || align="center"|G || align="left"|Northwestern || align="center"|3 || align="center"|– || 198 || 4,656 || 373 || 829 || 2,068 || 23.5 || 1.9 || 4.2 || 10.4 || align=center|
|-
|align="left"| || align="center"|G/F || align="left"|Tennessee || align="center"|1 || align="center"| || 4 || 32 || 5 || 4 || 9 || 8.0 || 1.3 || 1.0 || 2.3 || align=center|  
|-
|align="left"| || align="center"|G || align="left"|Western Kentucky || align="center"|2 || align="center"|– || 40 || 293 || 36 || 18 || 76 || 7.3 || 0.9 || 0.5 || 1.9 || align=center|
|-
|align="left"| || align="center"|G/F || align="left"|Kentucky || align="center"|1 || align="center"| || 37 || 1,408 || 152 || 104 || 678 || 38.1 || 4.1 || 2.8 || 18.3 || align=center|
|-
|align="left"| || align="center"|C || align="left"|Iowa State || align="center"|1 || align="center"| || 14 || 70 || 16 || 1 || 16 || 5.0 || 1.1 || 0.1 || 1.1 || align=center|
|-
|align="left"| || align="center"|G || align="left"|Utah || align="center"|7 || align="center"|–– || 447 || 13,979 || 1,691 || 2,978 || 5,354 || 31.3 || 3.8 || 6.7 || 12.0 || align=center|
|-
|align="left"| || align="center"|G/F || align="left"|Florida || align="center"|2 || align="center"|– || 67 || 524 || 91 || 62 || 91 || 7.8 || 1.4 || 0.9 || 1.4 || align=center|
|-
|align="left"| || align="center"|F || align="left"|Baylor || align="center"|2 || align="center"|– || 59 || 815 || 149 || 29 || 266 || 13.8 || 2.5 || 0.5 || 4.5 || align=center|
|-
|align="left"| || align="center"|F || align="left"|Michigan || align="center"|1 || align="center"| || 17 || 279 || 88 || 16 || 128 || 16.4 || 5.2 || 0.9 || 7.5 || align=center|
|-
|align="left" bgcolor="#CCFFCC"|x || align="center"|F || align="left"|Louisiana Tech || align="center"|4 || align="center"|– || 215 || 5,440 || 1,305 || 427 || 2,531 || 25.3 || 6.1 || 2.0 || 11.8 || align=center|
|-
|align="left"| || align="center"|F || align="left"|Toledo || align="center"|1 || align="center"| || 1 || 4 || 1 || 0 || 2 || 4.0 || 1.0 || 0.0 || 2.0 || align=center|
|-
|align="left"| || align="center"|F || align="left"|Loyola (IL) || align="center"|1 || align="center"| || 7 || 34 || 12 || 5 || 20 || 4.9 || 1.7 || 0.7 || 2.9 || align=center|
|-
|align="left"| || align="center"|G || align="left"|Hiram Scott || align="center"|1 || align="center"| || 18 || 211 || 19 || 8 || 69 || 11.7 || 1.1 || 0.4 || 3.8 || align=center|
|-
|align="left" bgcolor="#CCFFCC"|x || align="center"|G || align="left"|Iowa State || align="center"|4 || align="center"|– || 205 || 4,827 || 429 || 709 || 2,002 || 23.5 || 2.1 || 3.5 || 8.4 || align=center|
|-
|align="left"| || align="center"|G || align="left"|Canisius || align="center"|1 || align="center"| || 9 || 76 || 9 || 7 || 27 || 8.4 || 1.0 || 0.8 || 3.0 || align=center|
|-
|align="left"| || align="center"|C || align="left"|Russia || align="center"|5 || align="center"|– || 213 || 3,786 || 1,103 || 109 || 1,444 || 17.8 || 5.2 || 0.5 || 6.8 || align=center|
|-
|align="left"| || align="center"|G || align="left"|DR Congo || align="center"|3 || align="center"|– || 165 || 4,226 || 504 || 710 || 1,834 || 25.6 || 3.1 || 4.3 || 11.1 || align=center|
|-
|align="left"| || align="center"|G || align="left"|Providence || align="center"|1 || align="center"| || 12 || 114 || 11 || 24 || 45 || 9.5 || 0.9 || 2.0 || 3.8 || align=center|
|-
|align="left" bgcolor="#CCFFCC"|x || align="center"|G || align="left"|Kentucky || align="center"|5 || align="center"|– || 345 || 10,384 || 1,258 || 1,322 || 5,639 || 30.1 || 3.6 || 3.8 || 16.3 || align=center|
|-
|align="left"| || align="center"|F || align="left"|UCLA || align="center"|1 || align="center"| || 13 || 135 || 22 || 9 || 50 || 10.4 || 1.7 || 0.7 || 3.8 || align=center|
|-
|align="left"| || align="center"|F || align="left"|Kansas State || align="center"|1 || align="center"| || 71 || 2,495 || 637 || 64 || 1,165 || 35.1 || 9.0 || 0.9 || 16.4 || align=center|
|-
|align="left" bgcolor="#FFFF99"|^ (#55) || align="center"|C || align="left"|Georgetown || align="center"|5 || align="center"|– || 391 || 14,411 || 4,811 || 651 || 5,054 || 36.9 || 12.3 || 1.7 || 12.9 || align=center|
|}

N to P

|-
|align="left"| || align="center"|F || align="left"|Oklahoma || align="center"|4 || align="center"|– || 243 || 5,346 || 1,097 || 239 || 1,487 || 22.0 || 4.5 || 1.0 || 6.1 || align=center|
|-
|align="left" bgcolor="#FFCC00"|+ || align="center"|F || align="left"|Louisiana-Monroe || align="center"|5 || align="center"|– || 189 || 5,385 || 1,193 || 458 || 3,369 || 28.5 || 6.3 || 2.4 || 17.8 || align=center|
|-
|align="left"| || align="center"|G || align="left"|Georgia Tech || align="center"|1 || align="center"| || 10 || 125 || 16 || 37 || 44 || 12.5 || 1.6 || 3.7 || 4.4 || align=center|
|-
|align="left"| || align="center"|G || align="left"|Saint Joseph's || align="center"|3 || align="center"|– || 148 || 3,783 || 373 || 700 || 1,313 || 25.6 || 2.5 || 4.7 || 8.9 || align=center|
|-
|align="left"|Nenê || align="center"|F/C || align="left"|Brazil || align="center"|10 || align="center"|– || 555 || 16,445 || 3,859 || 1,014 || 6,868 || 29.6 || 7.0 || 1.8 || 12.4 || align=center|
|-
|align="left"| || align="center"|G/F || align="left"|Richmond || align="center"|1 || align="center"| || 74 || 2,176 || 141 || 138 || 1,089 || 29.4 || 1.9 || 1.9 || 14.7 || align=center|
|-
|align="left"| || align="center"|G || align="left"|Indiana State || align="center"|1 || align="center"| || 27 || 493 || 49 || 80 || 165 || 18.3 || 1.8 || 3.0 || 6.1 || align=center|
|-
|align="left" bgcolor="#CCFFCC"|x || align="center"|F || align="left"|Arizona || align="center"|1 || align="center"| || 42 || 397 || 65 || 10 || 136 || 9.5 || 1.5 || 0.2 || 3.2 || align=center|
|-
|align="left"| || align="center"|C || align="left"|Bosnia and Herzegovina || align="center"|3 || align="center"|– || 139 || 2,457 || 817 || 150 || 1,047 || 17.7 || 5.9 || 1.1 || 7.5 || align=center|
|-
|align="left"| || align="center"|F/C || align="left"|LSU || align="center"|1 || align="center"| || 7 || 46 || 11 || 2 || 20 || 6.6 || 1.6 || 0.3 || 2.9 || align=center|
|-
|align="left"| || align="center"|C || align="left"|Seattle || align="center"|1 || align="center"| || 4 || 21 || 5 || 0 || 4 || 5.3 || 1.3 || 0.0 || 1.0 || align=center|
|-
|align="left"| || align="center"|G || align="left"|La Salle || align="center"|1 || align="center"| || 55 || 607 || 63 || 106 || 182 || 11.0 || 1.1 || 1.9 || 3.3 || align=center|
|-
|align="left"| || align="center"|G || align="left"|USC || align="center"|4 || align="center"|– || 259 || 5,365 || 533 || 1,274 || 2,427 || 20.7 || 2.1 || 4.9 || 9.4 || align=center|
|-
|align="left"| || align="center"|F || align="left"|Greece || align="center"|1 || align="center"| || 26 || 294 || 40 || 16 || 67 || 11.3 || 1.5 || 0.6 || 2.6 || align=center|
|-
|align="left"| || align="center"|F || align="left"|Idaho State || align="center"|1 || align="center"| || 2 || 5 || 0 || 0 || 0 || 2.5 || 0.0 || 0.0 || 0.0 || align=center|
|-
|align="left"| || align="center"|F || align="left"|Cincinnati || align="center"|1 || align="center"| || 26 || 736 || 90 || 67 || 344 || 28.3 || 3.5 || 2.6 || 13.2 || align=center|
|-
|align="left"| || align="center"|G || align="left"|Auburn || align="center"|1 || align="center"| || 25 || 461 || 61 || 28 || 202 || 18.4 || 2.4 || 1.1 || 8.1 || align=center|
|-
|align="left"| || align="center"|C || align="left"|France || align="center"|2 || align="center"|– || 63 || 653 || 192 || 24 || 182 || 10.4 || 3.0 || 0.4 || 2.9 || align=center|
|-
|align="left"| || align="center"|F || align="left"|Bowling Green || align="center"|2 || align="center"|– || 151 || 3,121 || 615 || 87 || 1,459 || 20.7 || 4.1 || 0.6 || 9.7 || align=center|
|-
|align="left"| || align="center"|G || align="left"|Rice || align="center"|1 || align="center"| || 33 || 600 || 53 || 31 || 335 || 18.2 || 1.6 || 0.9 || 10.2 || align=center|
|-
|align="left"| || align="center"|F/C || align="left"|Duke || align="center"|4 || align="center"|– || 244 || 4,859 || 1,414 || 609 || 1,843 || 19.9 || 5.8 || 2.5 || 7.6 || align=center|
|-
|align="left"| || align="center"|F/C || align="left"|Boston University || align="center"|1 || align="center"| || 60 || 737 || 173 || 40 || 281 || 12.3 || 2.9 || 0.7 || 4.7 || align=center|
|-
|align="left"| || align="center"|F || align="left"|Kentucky || align="center"|2 || align="center"|– || 13 || 47 || 11 || 1 || 6 || 3.6 || 0.8 || 0.1 || 0.5 || align=center|
|-
|align="left" bgcolor="#CCFFCC"|x || align="center"|G || align="left"|Missouri || align="center"|2 || align="center"|– || 116 || 2,815 || 704 || 116 || 1,674 || 24.3 || 6.1 || 1.0 || 14.4 || align=center|
|-
|align="left"| || align="center"|G/F || align="left"|Xavier || align="center"|4 || align="center"|– || 261 || 7,417 || 1,322 || 567 || 2,462 || 28.4 || 5.1 || 2.2 || 9.4 || align=center|
|-
|align="left"| || align="center"|G || align="left"|Louisville || align="center"|2 || align="center"|– || 104 || 2,474 || 343 || 366 || 768 || 23.8 || 3.3 || 3.5 || 7.4 || align=center|
|}

R to S

|-
|align="left"| || align="center"|F || align="left"|Kansas || align="center"|2 || align="center"|– || 36 || 194 || 34 || 12 || 64 || 5.4 || 0.9 || 0.3 || 1.8 || align=center|
|-
|align="left"| || align="center"|F || align="left"|LSU || align="center"|2 || align="center"|– || 82 || 856 || 217 || 44 || 349 || 10.4 || 2.6 || 0.5 || 4.3 || align=center|
|-
|align="left"| || align="center"|C || align="left"|Oregon || align="center"|6 || align="center"|– || 429 || 9,158 || 2,558 || 355 || 4,319 || 21.3 || 6.0 || 0.8 || 10.1 || align=center|
|-
|align="left"| || align="center"|F || align="left"|Jacksonville || align="center"|3 || align="center"|– || 103 || 843 || 228 || 76 || 334 || 8.2 || 2.2 || 0.7 || 3.2 || align=center|
|-
|align="left"| || align="center"|G || align="left"|Washington || align="center"|1 || align="center"| || 3 || 13 || 2 || 1 || 6 || 4.3 || 0.7 || 0.3 || 2.0 || align=center|
|-
|align="left"| || align="center"|G || align="left"|UNLV || align="center"|1 || align="center"| || 10 || 173 || 33 || 12 || 93 || 17.3 || 3.3 || 1.2 || 9.3 || align=center|
|-
|align="left" bgcolor="#CCFFCC"|x || align="center"|G || align="left"|Duke || align="center"|1 || align="center"| || 15 || 403 || 35 || 39 || 131 || 26.9 || 2.3 || 2.6 || 8.7 || align=center|
|-
|align="left"| || align="center"|G/F || align="left"|Oral Roberts || align="center"|4 || align="center"|– || 187 || 3,517 || 769 || 245 || 1,531 || 18.8 || 4.1 || 1.3 || 8.2 || align=center|
|-
|align="left"| || align="center"|F/C || align="left"|Utah State || align="center"|3 || align="center"|– || 180 || 3,651 || 823 || 200 || 1,732 || 20.3 || 4.6 || 1.1 || 9.6 || align=center|
|-
|align="left"| || align="center"|G || align="left"|Washington || align="center"|2 || align="center"|– || 77 || 1,331 || 120 || 189 || 649 || 17.3 || 1.6 || 2.5 || 8.4 || align=center|
|-
|align="left"| || align="center"|F/C || align="left"|Kansas || align="center"|8 || align="center"|–– || 500 || 12,288 || 3,408 || 903 || 6,181 || 24.6 || 6.8 || 1.8 || 12.4 || align=center|
|-
|align="left"| || align="center"|G || align="left"|South Carolina || align="center"|3 || align="center"|– || 147 || 3,398 || 175 || 634 || 1,350 || 23.1 || 1.2 || 4.3 || 9.2 || align=center|
|-
|align="left"| || align="center"|F || align="left"|Wake Forest || align="center"|2 || align="center"|– || 159 || 3,548 || 611 || 262 || 1,619 || 22.3 || 3.8 || 1.6 || 10.2 || align=center|
|-
|align="left"| || align="center"|F || align="left"|Alabama || align="center"|1 || align="center"| || 40 || 355 || 80 || 9 || 89 || 8.9 || 2.0 || 0.2 || 2.2 || align=center|
|-
|align="left"| || align="center"|G/F || align="left"|Oklahoma || align="center"|1 || align="center"| || 40 || 294 || 47 || 16 || 85 || 7.4 || 1.2 || 0.4 || 2.1 || align=center|
|-
|align="left"| || align="center"|G/F || align="left"|Michigan || align="center"|2 || align="center"|– || 161 || 3,932 || 477 || 884 || 1,466 || 24.4 || 3.0 || 5.5 || 9.1 || align=center|
|-
|align="left"| || align="center"|F || align="left"|Long Beach State || align="center"|2 || align="center"|– || 71 || 1,029 || 173 || 73 || 307 || 14.5 || 2.4 || 1.0 || 4.3 || align=center|
|-
|align="left"| || align="center"|C || align="left"|Senegal || align="center"|1 || align="center"| || 6 || 24 || 9 || 1 || 4 || 4.0 || 1.5 || 0.2 || 0.7 || align=center|
|-
|align="left"| || align="center"|G/F || align="left"|St. John's || align="center"|1 || align="center"| || 26 || 469 || 61 || 16 || 134 || 18.0 || 2.3 || 0.6 || 5.2 || align=center|
|-
|align="left"| || align="center"|F/C || align="left"|California || align="center"|1 || align="center"| || 22 || 125 || 48 || 5 || 24 || 5.7 || 2.2 || 0.2 || 1.1 || align=center|
|-
|align="left"| || align="center"|G || align="left"|Cincinnati || align="center"|2 || align="center"|– || 58 || 980 || 87 || 161 || 312 || 16.9 || 1.5 || 2.8 || 5.4 || align=center|
|-
|align="left"| || align="center"|G || align="left"|Hawaii || align="center"|1 || align="center"| || 27 || 256 || 25 || 22 || 83 || 9.5 || 0.9 || 0.8 || 3.1 || align=center|
|-
|align="left"| || align="center"|F/C || align="left"|Syracuse || align="center"|8 || align="center"|– || 536 || 11,096 || 3,086 || 605 || 5,029 || 20.7 || 5.8 || 1.1 || 9.4 || align=center|
|-
|align="left"| || align="center"|F/C || align="left"|Purdue || align="center"|1 || align="center"| || 7 || 46 || 11 || 0 || 12 || 6.6 || 1.6 || 0.0 || 1.7 || align=center|
|-
|align="left" bgcolor="#FFFF99"|^ || align="center"|G/F || align="left"|North Carolina || align="center"|2 || align="center"|– || 148 || 4,477 || 376 || 678 || 1,586 || 30.3 || 2.5 || 4.6 || 10.7 || align=center|
|-
|align="left"| || align="center"|C || align="left"|St. John's || align="center"|1 || align="center"| || 21 || 252 || 103 || 8 || 82 || 12.0 || 4.9 || 0.4 || 3.9 || align=center|
|-
|align="left"| || align="center"|F/C || align="left"|Oklahoma || align="center"|1 || align="center"| || 54 || 1,623 || 488 || 66 || 870 || 30.1 || 9.0 || 1.2 || 16.1 || align=center|
|-
|align="left"| || align="center"|F/C || align="left"|Creighton || align="center"|1 || align="center"| || 81 || 1,959 || 606 || 132 || 582 || 24.2 || 7.5 || 1.6 || 7.2 || align=center|
|-
|align="left"| || align="center"|G || align="left"|Nebraska || align="center"|2 || align="center"|– || 95 || 2,516 || 266 || 197 || 858 || 26.5 || 2.8 || 2.1 || 9.0 || align=center|
|-
|align="left"| || align="center"|G/F || align="left"|Michigan State || align="center"|7 || align="center"|– || 519 || 16,227 || 2,246 || 1,950 || 10,130 || 31.3 || 4.3 || 3.8 || 19.5 || align=center|
|-
|align="left"| || align="center"|F || align="left"|Wyoming || align="center"|2 || align="center"|– || 29 || 262 || 64 || 14 || 134 || 9.0 || 2.2 || 0.5 || 4.6 || align=center|
|-
|align="left"| || align="center"|G || align="left"|Bradley || align="center"|3 || align="center"|– || 242 || 6,542 || 681 || 1,345 || 2,519 || 27.0 || 2.8 || 5.6 || 10.4 || align=center|
|-
|align="left"| || align="center"|G || align="left"|New Mexico || align="center"|1 || align="center"| || 1 || 2 || 0 || 0 || 0 || 2.0 || 0.0 || 0.0 || 0.0 || align=center|
|-
|align="left"| || align="center"|G/F || align="left"|Saint Benedict's Prep. (NJ) || align="center"|5 || align="center"|– || 372 || 9,187 || 1,148 || 804 || 5,084 || 24.7 || 3.1 || 2.2 || 13.7 || align=center|
|-
|align="left"| || align="center"|F || align="left"|Maryland || align="center"|1 || align="center"| || 11 || 148 || 40 || 3 || 56 || 13.5 || 3.6 || 0.3 || 5.1 || align=center|
|-
|align="left"| || align="center"|G || align="left"|North Carolina || align="center"|1 || align="center"| || 33 || 654 || 37 || 102 || 260 || 19.8 || 1.1 || 3.1 || 7.9 || align=center|
|-
|align="left"| || align="center"|G/F || align="left"|Jacksonville || align="center"|2 || align="center"|– || 43 || 359 || 64 || 33 || 173 || 8.3 || 1.5 || 0.8 || 4.0 || align=center|
|-
|align="left"| || align="center"|G || align="left"|UNLV || align="center"|2 || align="center"|– || 127 || 1,857 || 182 || 247 || 648 || 14.6 || 1.4 || 1.9 || 5.1 || align=center|
|-
|align="left"| || align="center"|C || align="left"|UNLV || align="center"|1 || align="center"| || 6 || 21 || 4 || 0 || 0 || 3.5 || 0.7 || 0.0 || 0.0 || align=center|
|-
|align="left"| || align="center"|G || align="left"|Virginia || align="center"|8 || align="center"|– || 458 || 13,248 || 1,614 || 968 || 4,982 || 28.9 || 3.5 || 2.1 || 10.9 || align=center|
|-
|align="left"| || align="center"|F/C || align="left"|Tennessee || align="center"|1 || align="center"| || 2 || 7 || 2 || 2 || 3 || 3.5 || 1.0 || 1.0 || 1.5 || align=center|
|-
|align="left"| || align="center"|G || align="left"|UTEP || align="center"|2 || align="center"|– || 26 || 207 || 28 || 39 || 43 || 8.0 || 1.1 || 1.5 || 1.7 || align=center|
|-
|align="left"| || align="center"|F || align="left"|Temple || align="center"|1 || align="center"| || 46 || 517 || 120 || 17 || 201 || 11.2 || 2.6 || 0.4 || 4.4 || align=center|
|}

T to V

|-
|align="left"| || align="center"|G/F || align="left"|Bradley || align="center"|1 || align="center"| || 20 || 345 || 51 || 44 || 154 || 17.3 || 2.6 || 2.2 || 7.7 || align=center|
|-
|align="left"| || align="center"|G || align="left"|Princeton || align="center"|1 || align="center"| || 39 || 1,222 || 98 || 132 || 452 || 31.3 || 2.5 || 3.4 || 11.6 || align=center|
|-
|align="left"| || align="center"|G || align="left"|La Salle || align="center"|2 || align="center"| || 155 || 3,566 || 432 || 625 || 938 || 23.0 || 2.8 || 4.0 || 6.1 || align=center|
|-
|align="left"| || align="center"|F || align="left"|Chattanooga || align="center"|2 || align="center"|– || 37 || 729 || 102 || 24 || 207 || 19.7 || 2.8 || 0.6 || 5.6 || align=center|
|-
|align="left"| || align="center"|G/F || align="left"|Stanford || align="center"|4 || align="center"|– || 277 || 3,592 || 438 || 392 || 1,647 || 13.0 || 1.6 || 1.4 || 5.9 || align=center|
|-
|align="left"| || align="center"|G || align="left"|Kentucky State || align="center"|1 || align="center"| || 25 || 406 || 51 || 44 || 96 || 16.2 || 2.0 || 1.8 || 3.8 || align=center|
|-
|align="left"| || align="center"|G || align="left"|Washington || align="center"|1 || align="center"| || 12 || 181 || 13 || 23 || 97 || 15.1 || 1.1 || 1.9 || 8.1 || align=center|
|-
|align="left"| || align="center"|G || align="left"|Tennessee State || align="center"|1 || align="center"| || 24 || 542 || 58 || 25 || 294 || 22.6 || 2.4 || 1.0 || 12.3 || align=center|
|-
|align="left"| || align="center"|G || align="left"|Oklahoma State || align="center"|1 || align="center"| || 65 || 1,047 || 96 || 179 || 445 || 16.1 || 1.5 || 2.8 || 6.8 || align=center|
|-
|align="left" bgcolor="#FFFF99"|^ (#33) || align="center"|G/F || align="left"|NC State || align="center"|7 || align="center"|– || 498 || 16,902 || 2,132 || 1,704 || 11,992 || 33.9 || 4.3 || 3.4 || 24.1 || align=center|
|-
|align="left"| || align="center"|F/C || align="left"|Texas || align="center"|1 || align="center"| || 17 || 105 || 26 || 0 || 7 || 6.2 || 1.5 || 0.0 || 0.4 || align=center|
|-
|align="left"| || align="center"|G/F || align="left"|France || align="center"|1 || align="center"| || 21 || 305 || 31 || 15 || 76 || 14.5 || 1.5 || 0.7 || 3.6 || align=center|
|-
|align="left"| || align="center"|G || align="left"|NC State || align="center"|2 || align="center"|– || 115 || 985 || 89 || 223 || 319 || 8.6 || 0.8 || 1.9 || 2.8 || align=center|
|-
|align="left"| || align="center"|F || align="left"|UNLV || align="center"|1 || align="center"| || 24 || 342 || 72 || 20 || 127 || 14.3 || 3.0 || 0.8 || 5.3 || align=center|
|-
|align="left"| || align="center"|G || align="left"|USC || align="center"|2 || align="center"|– || 19 || 193 || 31 || 10 || 70 || 10.2 || 1.6 || 0.5 || 3.7 || align=center|
|-
|align="left"| || align="center"|F || align="left"|Georgia || align="center"|3 || align="center"|– || 143 || 1,785 || 273 || 105 || 455 || 12.5 || 1.9 || 0.7 || 3.2 || align=center|
|-
|align="left"| || align="center"|G/F || align="left"|Ole Miss || align="center"|3 || align="center"|– || 232 || 4,561 || 704 || 467 || 1,120 || 19.7 || 3.0 || 2.0 || 4.8 || align=center|
|-
|align="left"| || align="center"|F || align="left"|Old Dominion || align="center"|1 || align="center"| || 24 || 123 || 30 || 7 || 84 || 5.1 || 1.3 || 0.3 || 3.5 || align=center|
|-
|align="left"| || align="center"|G/F || align="left"|Vanderbilt || align="center"|1 || align="center"| || 84 || 1,639 || 358 || 181 || 487 || 19.5 || 4.3 || 2.2 || 5.8 || align=center|
|-
|align="left"| || align="center"|G || align="left"|Cincinnati || align="center"|4 || align="center"|– || 245 || 9,179 || 834 || 2,047 || 4,325 || 37.5 || 3.4 || 8.4 || 17.7 || align=center|
|-
|align="left"| || align="center"|F || align="left"|Kentucky || align="center"|2 || align="center"|– || 26 || 110 || 31 || 9 || 34 || 4.2 || 1.2 || 0.2 || 1.3 || align=center|
|-
|align="left" bgcolor="#FFCC00"|+ || align="center"|F || align="left"|UCLA || align="center"|4 || align="center"|– || 293 || 9,794 || 1,541 || 782 || 6,829 || 33.4 || 5.3 || 2.7 || 23.3 || align=center|
|-
|align="left"| || align="center"|G || align="left"|Duke || align="center"|1 || align="center"| || 6 || 150 || 21 || 11 || 67 || 25.0 || 3.5 || 1.8 || 11.2 || align=center|
|-
|align="left"| || align="center"|F || align="left"|Czech Republic || align="center"|1 || align="center"| || 21 || 306 || 78 || 11 || 93 || 14.6 || 3.7 || 0.5 || 4.4 || align=center|
|-
|align="left"| || align="center"|F || align="left"|Michigan State || align="center"|2 || align="center"|– || 78 || 1,850 || 327 || 148 || 1,156 || 23.7 || 4.2 || 1.9 || 14.8 || align=center|
|-
|align="left"| ||align="center"|F/C || align="left"|Indiana || align="center"|1 || align="center"| || 7 || 30 || 8 || 2 || 13 || 4.3 || 1.1 || 0.3 || 1.9 || align=center|
|}

W to Z

|-
|align="left"| || align="center"|G || align="left"|Florida State || align="center"|1 || align="center"| || 21 || 90 || 10 || 5 || 27 || 4.3 || 0.5 || 0.2 || 1.3 || align=center|
|-
|align="left"| || align="center"|G || align="left"|Arkansas || align="center"|1 || align="center"| || 81 || 2,020 || 327 || 282 || 988 || 24.9 || 4.0 || 3.5 || 12.2 || align=center|
|-
|align="left"| || align="center"|F || align="left"|Tennessee State || align="center"|2 || align="center"| || 9 || 97 || 43 || 5 || 33 || 10.8 || 4.8 || 0.6 || 3.7 || align=center|
|-
|align="left"| || align="center"|G/F || align="left"|Tennessee State || align="center"|1 || align="center"| || 42 || 475 || 110 || 30 || 193 || 11.3 || 2.6 || 0.7 || 4.6 || align=center|
|-
|align="left"| || align="center"|F || align="left"|North Carolina || align="center"|1 || align="center"| || 50 || 438 || 89 || 30 || 196 || 8.8 || 1.8 || 0.6 || 3.9 || align=center|
|-
|align="left"| || align="center"|G || align="left"|Alabama || align="center"|2 || align="center"|– || 104 || 2,300 || 216 || 108 || 716 || 22.1 || 2.1 || 1.0 || 6.9 || align=center|
|-
|align="left"| || align="center"|G || align="left"|UCLA || align="center"|1 || align="center"| || 46 || 975 || 86 || 160 || 347 || 21.2 || 1.9 || 3.5 || 7.5 || align=center|
|-
|align="left"| || align="center"|C || align="left"|Morgan State || align="center"|2 || align="center"|– || 118 || 1,674 || 658 || 92 || 704 || 14.2 || 5.6 || 0.8 || 6.0 || align=center|
|-
|align="left"| || align="center"|G/F || align="left"|Arkansas || align="center"|1 || align="center"| || 12 || 55 || 4 || 3 || 19 || 4.6 || 0.3 || 0.3 || 1.6 || align=center|
|-
|align="left"| || align="center"|C || align="left"|UCLA || align="center"|1 || align="center"| || 11 || 36 || 4 || 5 || 18 || 3.3 || 0.4 || 0.5 || 1.6 || align=center|
|-
|align="left"| || align="center"|C || align="left"|St. John's || align="center"|1 || align="center"| || 28 || 149 || 52 || 7 || 53 || 5.3 || 1.9 || 0.3 || 1.9 || align=center|
|-
|align="left"| || align="center"|G || align="left"|Rhode Island || align="center"|1 || align="center"| || 1 || 3 || 0 || 2 || 4 || 3.0 || 0.0 || 2.0 || 4.0 || align=center|
|-
|align="left"| || align="center"|F || align="left"|Charlotte || align="center"|3 || align="center"|– || 186 || 3,079 || 452 || 217 || 1,427 || 16.6 || 2.4 || 1.2 || 7.7 || align=center|
|-
|align="left"| || align="center"|G || align="left"|Chattanooga || align="center"|2 || align="center"|– || 82 || 577 || 80 || 82 || 302 || 7.0 || 1.0 || 1.0 || 3.7 || align=center|
|-
|align="left"| || align="center"|G || align="left"|Clemson || align="center"|1 || align="center"| || 29 || 762 || 46 || 124 || 277 || 26.3 || 1.6 || 4.3 || 9.6 || align=center|
|-
|align="left"| || align="center"|F || align="left"|Georgetown || align="center"|1 || align="center"| || 4 || 12 || 0 || 0 || 0 || 3.0 || 0.0 || 0.0 || 0.0 || align=center|
|-
|align="left"| || align="center"|F || align="left"|Central State || align="center"|1 || align="center"| || 37 || 409 || 177 || 22 || 174 || 11.1 || 4.8 || 0.6 || 4.7 || align=center|
|-
|align="left"| || align="center"|G/F || align="left"|Indiana || align="center"|3 || align="center"|– || 236 || 7,586 || 1,204 || 966 || 2,865 || 32.1 || 5.1 || 4.1 || 12.1 || align=center|
|-
|align="left"| || align="center"|G || align="left"|Rice || align="center"|1 || align="center"| || 8 || 122 || 12 || 6 || 24 || 15.3 || 1.5 || 0.8 || 3.0 || align=center|
|-
|align="left"| || align="center"|F/C || align="left"|Xavier || align="center"|1 || align="center"| || 1 || 10 || 5 || 0 || 6 || 10.0 || 5.0 || 0.0 || 6.0 || align=center|
|-
|align="left"| || align="center"|F/C || align="left"|Arizona || align="center"|2 || align="center"|– || 143 || 2,768 || 744 || 103 || 1,137 || 19.4 || 5.2 || 0.7 || 8.0 || align=center|
|-
|align="left"| || align="center"|G || align="left"|Colorado || align="center"|3 || align="center"|– || 184 || 4,420 || 401 || 579 || 1,697 || 24.0 || 2.2 || 3.1 || 9.2 || align=center|
|-
|align="left"| || align="center"|F || align="left"|Providence || align="center"|2 || align="center"|– || 42 || 925 || 102 || 49 || 356 || 22.0 || 2.4 || 1.2 || 8.5 || align=center|
|-
|align="left"| || align="center"|F || align="left"|Notre Dame || align="center"|1 || align="center"| || 1 || 6 || 0 || 0 || 1 || 6.0 || 0.0 || 0.0 || 1.0 || align=center|
|-
|align="left"| || align="center"|F || align="left"|Arizona || align="center"|2 || align="center"|– || 58 || 583 || 147 || 15 || 153 || 10.1 || 2.5 || 0.3 || 2.6 || align=center|
|-
|align="left"| || align="center"|G/F || align="left"|Georgetown || align="center"|6 || align="center"|– || 419 || 12,556 || 1,923 || 1,222 || 5,934 || 30.0 || 4.6 || 2.9 || 14.2 || align=center|
|-
|align="left"| || align="center"|G || align="left"|Houston || align="center"|2 || align="center"|– || 153 || 3,367 || 330 || 825 || 1,319 || 22.0 || 2.2 || 5.4 || 8.6 || align=center|
|-
|align="left"| || align="center"|F/C || align="left"|North Carolina || align="center"|1 || align="center"| || 41 || 737 || 209 || 13 || 202 || 18.0 || 5.1 || 0.3 || 4.9 || align=center|
|-
|align="left"| || align="center"|G || align="left"|North Carolina || align="center"|1 || align="center"| || 27 || 712 || 61 || 138 || 255 || 26.4 || 2.3 || 5.1 || 9.4 || align=center|
|-
|align="left"| || align="center"|F || align="left"|Duke || align="center"|1 || align="center"| || 42 || 713 || 223 || 19 || 198 || 17.0 || 5.3 || 0.5 || 4.7 || align=center|
|-
|align="left"| || align="center"|F/C || align="left"|Michigan State || align="center"|1 || align="center"| || 43 || 1,059 || 309 || 29 || 413 || 24.6 || 7.2 || 0.7 || 9.6 || align=center|
|-
|align="left"| || align="center"|G || align="left"|Hanover || align="center"|2 || align="center"|– || 48 || 297 || 52 || 35 || 148 || 6.2 || 1.1 || 0.7 || 3.1 || align=center|
|-
|align="left"| || align="center"|F || align="left"|Drake || align="center"|1 || align="center"| || 75 || 1,403 || 253 || 142 || 616 || 18.7 || 3.4 || 1.9 || 8.2 || align=center|
|-
|align="left"| || align="center"|F || align="left"|Western Carolina || align="center"|1 || align="center"| || 50 || 453 || 98 || 15 || 196 || 9.1 || 2.0 || 0.3 || 3.9 || align=center|
|-
|align="left"| || align="center"|F/C || align="left"|North Carolina || align="center"|3 || align="center"|– || 198 || 3,374 || 766 || 198 || 880 || 17.0 || 3.9 || 1.0 || 4.4 || align=center|
|-
|align="left"| || align="center"|G || align="left"|La Salle || align="center"|1 || align="center"| || 8 || 72 || 6 || 12 || 19 || 9.0 || 0.8 || 1.5 || 2.4 || align=center|
|-
|align="left"| || align="center"|F || align="left"|Notre Dame || align="center"|1 || align="center"| || 53 || 1,823 || 361 || 119 || 1,330 || 34.4 || 6.8 || 2.2 || 25.1 || align=center|
|-
|align="left"| || align="center"|F/C || align="left"|Seattle || align="center"|1 || align="center"| || 39 || 489 || 133 || 37 || 236 || 12.5 || 3.4 || 0.9 || 6.1 || align=center|
|-
|align="left"| || align="center"|F || align="left"|UCLA || align="center"|1 || align="center"| || 2 || 7 || 1 || 0 || 2 || 3.5 || 0.5 || 0.0 || 1.0 || align=center|
|-
|align="left"| || align="center"|G || align="left"|Colorado State || align="center"|4 || align="center"|– || 227 || 6,440 || 691 || 453 || 2,728 || 28.4 || 3.0 || 2.0 || 12.0 || align=center|
|-
|align="left"| || align="center"|G/F || align="left"|Tennessee || align="center"|1 || align="center"| || 59 || 1,381 || 162 || 130 || 406 || 23.4 || 2.7 || 2.2 || 6.9 || align=center|
|-
|align="left"| || align="center"|G/F || align="left"|USC || align="center"|1 || align="center"| || 4 || 37 || 1 || 2 || 9 || 9.3 || 0.3 || 0.5 || 2.3 || align=center|
|-
|align="left"| || align="center"|C || align="left"|UCLA || align="center"|2 || align="center"|– || 22 || 130 || 36 || 6 || 70 || 5.9 || 1.6 || 0.3 || 3.2 || align=center|
|}

References

External links
 Denver Nuggets all-time roster
 

National Basketball Association all-time rosters

roster